"Dear Diary" is a song by Japanese recording artist Namie Amuro, released as a double A-side single with her track "Fighter". It was released on October 26, 2016 via Dimension Point and Avex Trax as Amuro's seventh consecutive non-album single, and is the theme song to the Japanese drama–horror film, Death Note: Light Up the New World (2016). It was distributed with "Dear Diary" in two physical formats—standard CD and CD/DVD bundle. "Dear Diary" was written, composed and produced by Matthew Tishler, Felicia Barton, Aaron Benward, and frequent collaborator Tiger. Musically, the recording is a pop ballad that lyrically focuses on the films title and recurring theme; furthermore, it delves into themes of empowerment and rising from pain and sorrow.

Upon its release, "Dear Diary" received generally favorable reviews from music critics. Majority of them commended the production and songwriting, alongside praising the singers vocals. Commercially, both recordings experienced success in Japan, peaking at number three on the daily and weekly Oricon Singles Chart and on component Billboard charts in that region. An accompanying music video was directed by Ryouhei Shingu, whom previously worked with Amuro on her July 2016 single "Hero"; it depicts her on a beach front, gazing at large glass bottles that encompass several houses, people and fauna. In order to promote the track, "Dear Diary" was broadcast on several Japanese television shows and was included on the singers 2016–17 Live Style tour in Japan.

Background and composition
In December 2015, Amuro returned to releasing non-album singles with "Red Carpet"; this was after distributing her eleventh studio album Genic in June that same year. Alongside this, the singer released the singles: "Mint" (May 2016), and "Hero" (July 2016), with the latter being used as the official theme song to the NHK broadcasting of the Summer Olympics and Paralympics. In August, Amuro confirmed her involvement with the Japanese drama–horror film, Death Note: Light Up the New World, based on the anime and manga series of the same name. Originally, Takahiro Sato, the film's co-producer, wanted to enlist Western musicians to provide songs to the movie, which he used Red Hot Chili Peppers or Lenny Kravitz as examples. However, knowing that the series was already popular around the globe, Sato decided to enlist Amuro in order to get the audience to recognized the "power of foreign artists" and also promote her work overseas. Amuro herself expressed her gratitude for participating in the film's soundtrack.

The singer revealed the titles to be "Dear Diary" and "Fighter", which were served as double A-side singles; this is her first to do so since 2014's "Big Boys Cry/Beautiful". The former track was allocated as the film's theme song, whilst "Fighter" was used as the insert track—a term used in Japan for a recording placed randomly throughout the film. Additionally, "Fighter" served as the theme tune for the film's spin-off series, Death Note: New Generation, which premiered on streaming service Hulu.

"Dear Diary" was written, composed and produced by Matthew Tishler, Felicia Barton, Aaron Benward, and frequent collaborator Tiger. Furthermore, Emyli provided background vocals to both this track and "Dear Diary". The tracks were recorded by Wataru Namifusa at LAB Recordings in Minato-ku, Tokyo, Japan. According to Amuro's website, "Dear Diary" was described as a pop ballad that lyrically intertwines with the films title and recurring theme. Expanding on this, Japanese critic Kanako Hayawaka noted that the track emphasized a "painful" delivery by Amuro, accompanied by a gentle piano riff, and showcased a theme change from "sadness to strength". The critic also believed that both "Dear Diary" and "Fighter" shared similar themes but were expressed in different styles of music. Additionally, a member at the website Arama Japan believed the lyrics delve into an "answer [of] humanity's hesitation towards conflict." Although its recorded in Japanese, portions of the track includes English language.

Release and critical reception
A snippet of "Dear Diary" was published through a trailer of the film. On September 26, 2016, the entire track was leaked online in low quality. Subsequently, it was released on October 26, 2016 via Dimension Point and Avex Trax as Amuro's seventh consecutive non-album single, following "Hero". Additionally, the single was distributed as a double A-side single with "Fighter" in two physical formats: a standard CD, and CD/DVD bundle. Both formats include the tracks and their instrumental versions, whilst the DVD set features both music videos. The CD artwork is an outtake shot from the music video of "Dear Diary", whilst the CD and DVD cover, representing "Fighter", features Amuro in dark clothing and make-up, surrounded by black feathers. A limited edition cover, featuring Amuro and the film's mascot character Ryuk, was published throughout selected Japanese retails and at her 2016–2017 Live Style concert venues. Two bonus posters were distributed through Japanese store CDJapan, for those whom pre-ordered the CD and DVD bundle versions. Promotional pop-up cards were made available at her Live Style venues, which incorporated an image of Amuro and promoted aesthetics of Halloween 2016.

The recording received generally favorable reviews from music critics. After the track was leaked online on September 26, 2016, a staff member from SBS PopAsia mentioned that he/she were "over the moon" of the production and its inclusion in the film. Additionally, Japanese critic Kanako Hayawaka enjoyed the song, commending its lyrical content and the composition; she labelled it a "beautiful song". An editor at Excite.co.jp described both tracks as "charm[s]". Masahiro Higashide, who plays one of the film's protagonist characters, Tsukuru Mishima, expressed his enjoyment of the track upon its release.

Commercial performance
Commercially,  "Dear Diary" experienced success in Japan. On October 26, 2016, both singles entered together at number four on the daily Oricon Singles Chart, the fourth highest debut of that week. The following day, it slipped to number six but rose to number three on October 29, selling an additional 4,553 copies in that region. On November 1, the single dropped from number three to number 21, one of her quickest falls. Based on the first seven-day statistics, "Dear Diary" and "Fighter" opened at number three on the weekly Oricon Singles Chart with over 45,000 units sold, making this Amuro's highest first-week sales since "Go Round" / "Yeah-Oh!" in 2012. By the end of October 2016, Oricon ranked the singles at number 15. It slipped to number 14 the following week, selling 8,911 units, and fell again to number 22 with 3,985 sales. Separately, "Dear Diary" experienced success on component charts by Billboard Japan. Before its initial release, it debuted at number 60 on the Japan Radio Songs chart, the 11th highest debuting track on that chart. It rose to number 15 the following week, and also debuted at number 7 and number four on the Japan Hot 100 and Japan Top Singles Sales chart.

Music video
An accompanying music video was directed by Ryouhei Shingu, whom previously worked with Amuro on her July 2016 single "Hero". It opens with a diary and quill on a desk, with the pages being blown by a gust of wind. The scene turns black and changes to Amuro on a beach front, before dawn, surrounded by large drift wood with lanterns. Several intercepting shots include the beach waves going towards shore and Amuro singing the track. By the first chorus, a distance shot of the ocean features glass bottles that are housing several homes, people and fauna. As the song progresses, the sun starts to rise, and various angles of the people inside the bottles express their sadness. As the final chorus opens, the bottle tops melt away and burst out a large rift of water below a newly-risen sun and multi-colored clouds. The visual ends with Amuro gazing in the distance, and turning to the camera. A promotional teaser of the video, alongside a snippet of "Fighter", was uploaded on Amuro's YouTube channel.

Promotion
In order to promote the single, several Japanese television shows broadcast special commemorations for Amuro, the accompanying film and the respective music videos to "Dear Diary" and "Fighter"; on October 26, Music On! Japan TV hosted a visual special, including "Dear Diary" and "Fighter" and her previous releases. Likewise, Space Shower TV premiered a music video special dedicated to the two singles and footage from the Death Note movie. The single was included on the singer's 2016–17 Live Style tour in Japan; it was revealed two months prior in August 2016.

Track listing and formats

CD single
"Dear Diary" — 3:30
"Fighter" — 3:28
"Dear Diary" (Instrumental) — 3:30
"Fighter" (Instrumental) — 3:28

DVD single
"Dear Diary" — 3:30
"Fighter" — 3:28
"Dear Diary" (Instrumental) — 3:30
"Fighter" (Instrumental) — 3:28
"Dear Diary" (music video) — 3:30
"Fighter" (music video) — 3:32

Limited edition CD
"Dear Diary" — 3:30
"Fighter" — 3:28

Credits and personnel
Credits adapted from the liner notes of the single's CD and DVD release.

Recording and management
Recorded by Wataru Namifura at LAB Recordings, Japan in 2016; mixed and mastered by D.O.I. and Tom Coyne at Sterling Studios, New York City, New York. Management by Stella88 and Avex Trax.

Credits

Namie Amuro – vocals
Matthew Tishler – songwriting, production
Felicia Barton – songwriting
Aaron Benward – songwriting
Tiger – songwriting
Ats – arrangement, keyboards, programming
Sayuri Yano – string arrangements
Tomoko Jono – violin
Naoko Ishibashi – violin
Akane Irie – violin
Yuko Kajitani – violin
Naotaka Tamura – violin
Ayumu Koshikawa – violin
Ken Okabe – violin
Daisuke Yamamoto – violin
Akiko Shimauchi – violin
Shoko Miki – viola
Sayo Takimoto – viola
Matsutami Endo – cello
Azura Haraguchi – cello
Masatake Osato – string recording engineer
Ryoma Mokonuma – assistant engineer
Yuki Iwabuchi – music creative director
Emyli – background vocals, vocal director
Ryouhei Shingu – music video director
Tatsuya Fukuda – art direction, design
Wataru Yoshioka – design
Yasunari Kikuma – photographer
Akemi Nakano – hair & make-up
Satomi Kurihara – hair & make-up
Akira Noda – stylist

Charts

Oricon charts

Billboard charts

Release history

Sales

See also
Music of Death Note: Light Up the New World

Notes

References

External links
"Dear Diary" / "Fighter" at Namie Amuro's website. 

2016 singles
Namie Amuro songs
2016 songs
Avex Trax singles
Songs written by Matthew Tishler
Songs written by Felicia Barton
Songs written by Aaron Benward